Alexander Robert Edgar (8 April 1850 – 23 April 1914) was an early Methodist missionary in Australia.

Biography
Edgar, was the second of five sons of Edward and Mary Edgar (who also had four daughters) and was born in County Tipperary, Ireland. The family moved to Melbourne in February 1855, and about two years later his family settled at St Arnaud, then a small mining town. He attended the local school until he was about 14, when he became a pupil-teacher in it. Edgar resigned due to the small salary and tried gold-digging, but he had outgrown his strength and found the work too hard. A year of tutoring followed, and then gold-mining again, farming work, quarrying, and other occupations, until in 1870 he obtained a share in a gold-mine which gave very good returns.

His family belonged to the Anglican church, but when about 17 years old, Edgar came under the influence of a Methodist minister, the Rev. A. Stubbs, and two years later made up his mind that if possible he would enter the church. Edgar became a teacher in a Sunday school and then a local preacher. In September 1871 he was nominated as a candidate for the Methodist ministry, and in April 1872 began his training at the provisional theological institute at Wesley College, Melbourne. In April 1874 he received his first appointment and began his probationary ministry at Kangaroo Flat, where he spent two years before his transfer to Inglewood. In 1878, having completed his probationary period, he was ordained at Wesley church, Melbourne. In April 1879 he joined the Forest Street circuit at Bendigo, and this was followed by other ministries at Sebastopol, Ballarat (1881–84), Port Melbourne (1884–87), Chilwell (1887–90), Geelong West and Geelong (1890–93). Edgar had the ability to attract people to him and to his church.

Edgar had proved his worth during his 19 years in the ministry, but at 43 years of age he was only on the threshold of his greatest work. About this time the future of Wesley Church, Melbourne, was giving great anxiety. It was on the edge of a slum neighbourhood and for some years the congregation had been steadily declining. About the end of 1892 it was decided to found a central mission, and that Edgar should be its superintendent. In April 1893 Edgar took up his new work. He had no defined plans, but after a few weeks began the series of afternoon conferences afterwards known as the "Pleasant Sunday Afternoon Service". The question of sweatshops in the clothing and other trades was causing much interest about this time, and after accompanying a deputation to the premier of Victoria, Edgar called a meeting one Sunday afternoon at Wesley church, when the evils of the system were placed before the audience by several speakers. Another meeting was held a week later and largely as a result of them a Royal Commission was appointed to investigate and report. When wages boards began to be appointed to regulate wages and working conditions, Edgar was appointed chairman of the first one, the white workers' board, and proved to be a valuable arbitrator. Many social evils were discussed at the Sunday afternoon services, and sometimes much opposition was aroused. But Edgar went on his way, he had intimate knowledge of the difficulties of the lower paid workers, and not a little of the advanced legislation of the period drew its inspiration from speakers at his church. It was a period of depression following a financial crisis, and Edgar opened a free labour bureau, gave a home to committees of unemployed that were formed, and did much organizing in connexion with relief measures. Living close to a slum district of bad reputation, he met with many difficult problems. A "Sisterhood" was formed which did valuable work with children and outcast women, and in 1895 the South Yarra home for unfortunate women was taken over. A hospice for men was opened in Lonsdale Street, Melbourne which was afterwards removed to La Trobe Street, Melbourne and finally to Arden Street, North Melbourne.

Later a Boys' Farm was established at Burwood, Victoria, where hundreds of boys were trained as good citizens. Edgar had much experience of the evils arising from alcohol and drug-taking, and arranged to take over a system known as the bichloride of gold treatment, which under the supervision of qualified medical men was found helpful in some cases. In 1913 Edgar's health deteriorated and he died at Melbourne on 23 April 1914 of heart disease. He had married 3 April 1878 Katharine Haslam who survived him with two daughters. There is also a stained-glass window to his memory in Wesley Church.

References
Ian F. McLaren, 'Edgar, Alexander Robert (1850 - 1914)', Australian Dictionary of Biography, Volume 8, MUP, 1981, pp 408–409. Retrieved on 7 October 2008.

Australian Methodist ministers
1850 births
1914 deaths
People from County Tipperary
Australian Methodist missionaries
Converts to Methodism from Anglicanism
Irish emigrants to colonial Australia
Irish Methodists
Wesleyan Methodists
20th-century Methodists
Methodist missionaries in Australia